Hapalocystis is a genus of fungi in the family Sydowiellaceae.

Species
As accepted by Species Fungorum;
Hapalocystis berkeleyi 
Hapalocystis bicaudata 
Hapalocystis corni 
Hapalocystis kickxii 
Hapalocystis occidentalis 
Hapalocystis ulmi 
Hapalocystis vexans 

Former species;
 H. berkeleyi var. kickxii  = Hapalocystis kickxii, Sydowiellaceae
 H. mirabilis  = Sorokinocystis mirabilis, Chytridiales order

References

Sordariomycetes genera
Diaporthales